Song and Legend is the debut studio album by English gothic rock band Sex Gang Children. It was released in 1983 by record label Illuminated.

Content 
Trouser Press described Tony James' production as "[smothering] everything [...] in tons of echo, giving the album a haunting, catacomb sheen".

Release 
According to The Rough Guide to Rock, the album "shot to the top of the indie charts, along with its accompanying single 'Sebastiane'".

Critical reception 
Trouser Press called Song and Legend "a landmark in gothic/post-punk, holding forth with an unequalled baroque fury".

Track listing

Personnel 
 Sex Gang Children

 Andi (Andi Sexgang) – vocals, guitar
 Terry MacLeay – guitar
 Dave Roberts – bass guitar
 Rob Stroud – drums

 Technical

 Tony James – production
 Ken Thomas – engineering

References

External links 

 

1983 debut albums
Sex Gang Children albums